Thomas Prendergast (1806–1886) was an East India Company civil servant and writer on language learning. 

Thomas Prendergast may also refer to:
Sir Thomas Prendergast, 1st Baronet (c.1660–1709), Irish politician and soldier
Sir Thomas Prendergast, 2nd Baronet (died 1760), Irish politician
Thomas Francis Prendergast (1871–1913), American soldier and Medal of Honor recipient
Thomas F. Prendergast (railroad executive) (b. 1952/1953), former chairman and CEO of the Metropolitan Transportation Authority in New York

See also
 Tom Prendergast (Laois footballer)
 Tom Prendergast (Kerry footballer)